The 2014 Ole Miss Rebels baseball team represented the University of Mississippi, familiarly known as Ole Miss, in the 2014 NCAA Division I baseball season. The Rebels were led by 14th-year head coach Mike Bianco, and played their home games in Oxford at Swayze Field, adjacent to campus. They compete in the Southeastern Conference's Western Division, and won their division in 2014.

The Rebels hosted an NCAA regional and defeated the #13 Washington Huskies twice in one-run games to finish undefeated. In the Super Regional at Louisiana-Lafayette, Ole Miss won in three games to advance to the College World Series, their first since 1972. The Rebels reached the semifinals and lost twice to Virginia. Ole Miss lost their opener by a run, then eliminated Texas Tech and TCU to reach the semifinals, but fell again to Virginia.

Personnel

Roster

Coaches

Schedule

Ranking Movements

References

Ole Miss Rebels
Ole Miss Rebels baseball seasons
College World Series seasons
Ole Miss Rebels Baseball
Ole Miss